Steinach railway station is a railway station in Steinach, in the Swiss canton of St. Gallen. It is located on the Lake line of Swiss Federal Railways.

Services 
 the following services stop at Steinach:

 St. Gallen S-Bahn : half-hourly service between Rorschach and Romanshorn and hourly service to Weinfelden; on Saturdays and Sundays, service every two hours from Rorschach to  via .

References

External links 
 
 

Railway stations in the canton of St. Gallen
Swiss Federal Railways stations